Sluggo may refer to:

Fictional characters
Sluggo or Mr. Sluggo, in the "Mr. Bill Show" short films
Sluggo Smith, in the comic strip Nancy
Sluggo, a Marvel Comics character in the Weapon X program

People with the nickname
Slug (rapper) (born 1972), American rapper known as Little Sluggo
Sluggo Boyce, Canadian professional skateboarder and snowboarder
Dave Katz (songwriter) (born 1961), American record producer and songwriter
Sam Phipps (born 1953), American musician, member of Oingo Boingo
Vic Ruggiero, American musical artist known as Lord Sluggo
Don Slaught (born 1958), American baseball player

Other uses
Sluggo (route), in American football, a type of pass route
Sluggo!, a late 1970s punk rock/new wave music fanzine

Lists of people by nickname